The Prakriya Green Wisdom School is a school in Bangalore, India. The school philosophy is based on nature, natural growth and nature-based learning.  

The school's website says that the name comes from the Sanskrit word "Prakruti" which means "Nature".

Description
Prakriya Green Wisdom School is the only school in India to have won the Wipro Earthian award thrice in a row. Gardening, pottery, weaving and nature walks are some of the earth-based activities. 

The school has outdoor classrooms and special locations for the students to do their academic work . The school offers the ICSE board, IGCSE has been discontinued as of April 2014.

Policies
Prakriya lays emphasis on the avoidance of processed food. The management does not allow its students to bring any form of processed or bought food, even white bread is not allowed. 

The school promotes Community service such as cleaning the school, prepare vegetables for the canteen or growing food in the kitchen garden for students

References

External links
Official website

1999 establishments in India
High schools and secondary schools in Bangalore